Caricature Portrait of Tulla Larsen (Norwegian: Karikert portrett av Tulla Larsen) is an oil on canvas painting by Edvard Munch. It is in the collection of the Munch Museum in Oslo.

The 1905 painting, depicting Munch and Tulla Larsen, was sawn in half by Munch after he was shot in his left hand after a bedroom scuffle.

In Gerd Woll's catalogue raisonné from 2008, Self-Portrait against a Green Background is listed as number 645 and Caricature Portrait of Tulla Larsen is listed as number 646.

References

External links
 Selvportrett mot grønn bakgrunn at the Munch Museum
 Karikert portrett av Tulla Larsen at the Munch Museum
 Self-Portrait against a Green Background and Karikert portrett av Tulla Larsen at the Munch Museum

1905 paintings
Modern paintings
Paintings by Edvard Munch
Paintings in the collection of the Munch Museum